Of the 11 Indiana incumbents, 10 were re-elected.

See also 
 List of United States representatives from Indiana
 United States House of Representatives elections, 1972

1972
Indiana
1972 Indiana elections